CCP may refer to:

Economy or finance 

 Central counterparty clearing, a method by which a financial institution facilitates transactions in security markets
 Common commercial policy, a process by which countries co-ordinate or completely delegate their trade policy

Education 

 Center for Creative Photography, a research facility and archival repository at the University of Arizona, Tucson
 Central Colleges of the Philippines, an educational institution in Quezon City, Philippines
 Centre for Child Protection, an institute of the Gregorian University dedicated to understanding and preventing sexual abuse in the Catholic Church
 Circle City Prep, a public K-8 charter school in Indianapolis, Indiana
 Community College of Philadelphia, a community college in Philadelphia, Pennsylvania
 University of Chicago Contemporary Chamber Players, an American ensemble dedicated to the performance of contemporary classical music

Government, law 

 Canadians' Choice Party, a small, far-right provincial party in Ontario, Canada
 Chinese Communist Party, officially the Communist Party of China
 Chinese Confession Program, a program run by the United States Immigration and Naturalization Services between 1956 and 1965 to get people of Chinese origin who had immigrated on false pretences to confess to immigration fraud
 Coimbatore City Police, India
 Competition Commission of Pakistan, an independent agency of the Government of Pakistan for the enforcement of economic competition laws
 Concealed Carry Permit, required in parts of the United States to carry a gun hidden on their person

Organizations 

 Center for Competitive Politics, an organization promoting free speech rights in the United States.
 Centre for Contemporary Photography, a photography gallery in Melbourne, Australia
 Ceylon College of Physicians, a medical association in Sri Lanka
 Confederación Campesina del Perú, a peasant organization in Peru
 Cultural Center of the Philippines, an organization focused on promoting and preserving Filipino art and culture

Science 

 Capacitively coupled plasma, a style of industrial plasma source commonly used in microfabrication
 Cell cycle progression, the series of events that takes place in a cell
 Complement control protein,  proteins that interact with components of the complement system
 Context change potential, analysis of natural language, establishing meaning on the dynamic basis of prior shared information
 Cubic close-packed, a type of crystal structure
 Cyclic citrullinated peptide, a chemical whose presence in the blood is an indicator of rheumatoid arthritis
 Cytochrome c peroxidase, an enzyme found in yeast that catalyzes the decomposition of hydrogen peroxide

Computing 

 CAN Calibration Protocol, a protocol for communication with embedded systems with CAN interfaces
 CCP Games, an Icelandic video game developer
 Common-closure principle, one of the package principles of object-oriented design
 Compression Control Protocol, a subprotocol of PPP
 Console Command Processor, a component of the CP/M operating system
 Context change potential, in natural language processing, the evaluation of new input against most recent output

Professional certification 

 Certification in Clinical Perfusion, a professional designation that certifies the competency of cardiovascular perfusionists
 Certified Cheese Professional, a professional certification awarded by the American Cheese Society
 Certified College Planning Specialist, a designation issued by the National Institute of Certified College Planners
 Certified Compensation Professional, a professional certification awarded by the WorldatWork Society of Certified Professionals
 Certified Computing Professional, a professional certification administered by the Institute for Certification of Computing Professionals
 Certified Cost Professional, a professional certification awarded by Association for the Advancement of Cost Engineering (AACE) International
 Certified Credit Professional, a professional designation granted by the Credit Institute of Canada
 CESG Certified Professional, a framework for certifying information assurance professionals in UK government and industry

Other uses 

 Carbonless copy paper, a type of paper allowing multiple copies of one writing
 Carriel Sur International Airport, Chile, by IATA airport code
 Chakma language (ISO 639-3: ccp), an Indo-European language spoken by the Chakma and Daingnet people
 Club Cerro Porteño, a football team in Paraguay
 Commercial Crew Program, a human spaceflight program operated by NASA
 Compact Carry Pistol Division, a shooting division of the International Defensive Pistol Association
 Conference on Cataloguing Principles, influential international conference on library cataloging in Paris in 1961
 Country Club Plaza, a regional shopping center in Kansas City (also CCP KC)
 Critical control point, a food safety procedure
 Cross County Parkway, a road in Westchester County, New York, USA

See also 

 CCCP (disambiguation)